Graham Paul Southernwood (5 November 1971) is an English former professional rugby league footballer who played in the 1980s and 1990s.

Background
Graham Southernwood was born in Hemsworth, West Riding of Yorkshire, England.

Playing career

Challenge Cup Final appearances
Graham Southernwood played  in Castleford's 12-28 defeat by Wigan in the 1992 Challenge Cup Final during the 1991–92 season at Wembley Stadium, London on Saturday 2 May 1992, in front of a crowd of 77,386.

County Cup Final appearances
Graham Southernwood played in Castleford's 26-6 victory over Bradford Northern in the 1991 Yorkshire County Cup Final during the 1991–92 season at Elland Road, Leeds on Sunday 20 October 1991.

Club career
Graham Southernwood made his début for Castleford in the 28-2 victory over Workington Town on Sunday 30 October 1988. Graham Southernwood played, made his début for the Featherstone Rovers on Sunday 6 February 1994, he scored a try in the Featherstone Rovers' 22-39 defeat by Leeds in the 1995 Challenge Cup semi-final during 1994–95 season at Elland Road, Leeds on Saturday 1 April 1995, and he played his last match for Featherstone Rovers during the 1995–96 season.

Genealogical information
Graham Southernwood is the father of the rugby league footballer, Cain Southernwood, and is the younger brother of the rugby league footballer; Roy Southernwood, and David John Southernwood (birth registered during fourth ¼  in Hemsworth district), and is the older brother of Kevin Roger Southernwood (birth registered during fourth ¼  in Wakefield district).

References

External links
Graham Southernwood Memory Box Search at archive.castigersheritage.com

1971 births
Living people
Castleford Tigers players
English rugby league players
Featherstone Rovers players
Hunslet R.L.F.C. players
People from Hemsworth
Rugby league hookers
Rugby league players from Wakefield
Southernwood family